Edgar Chatman (born January 12, 1917) is an American former Negro league pitcher who played in the 1940s.

A native of Ville Platte, Louisiana, Chatman played for the Memphis Red Sox in 1944 and 1945. In five recorded appearances on the mound, he posted a 3.57 ERA over 35.1 innings.

References

External links
 and Seamheads

1917 births
Memphis Red Sox players
Baseball pitchers
Baseball players from Louisiana
People from Ville Platte, Louisiana
Possibly living people